Haleem Adil Sheikh is a Pakistani politician who has been a member of the Provincial Assembly of Sindh since August 2018, and has served as leader of opposition of the Provincial Assembly of Sindh since January 2021.  Sheikh served as the parliamentary leader of PTI in Provincial Assembly of Sindh from August 2018 to January 2021, and was the president of PTI for Sindh from 21 July 2019 to 25 December 2021.

Political career
Sheikh was elected to the Provincial Assembly of Sindh as a candidate of Pakistan Tehreek-e-Insaf from constituency PS-99 (Karachi East-I) in 2018 Pakistani general election.

In January 2021, he was appointed as leader of opposition of Sindh Assembly.

Sheikh was arrested 25 Aug 2022 by the Anti-Encroachment Force (AEF) sindh in connection with a land-grabbing case. The AEF produced him in the court of Malir’s judicial magistrate today.

He was released from jail on 9 September 2022 after a court accepted his bail plea.

External Link

More Reading
 List of members of the 15th Provincial Assembly of Sindh
 List of Pakistan Tehreek-e-Insaf elected members (2013–2018)
 No-confidence motion against Imran Khan

References

Living people
Pakistan Tehreek-e-Insaf MPAs (Sindh)
Year of birth missing (living people)